Jerome's first epistle to Paulinus is the letter number 53 of Jerome, addressed to Paulinus of Nola.

It has been used as the preface for the Gutenberg Bible. This Bible was published by Johannes Gutenberg and Johann Fust in Mainz, Germany in 1454. The Gutenberg Bible is an edition of a 4th-century Latin translation of the Bible known as the Vulgate or common text.

Jerome
Jerome was a prominent religious figure – a Christian priest, confessor, theologian, historian and Doctor of the Church. He was recognised as a Saint by the Roman Catholic Church, the Eastern Orthodox Churches, and the Church of England and was responsible for a translation of the Bible into Latin: the Vulgate.

In Bible editions 
Many medieval Vulgate manuscripts included Jerome's epistle number 53, to Paulinus bishop of Nola, as a general prologue to the whole Bible. Notably, this letter was printed at the head of the Gutenberg Bible. Jerome's letter promotes the study of each of the books of the Old and New Testaments listed by name (and excluding any mention of the deuterocanonical books); and its dissemination had the effect of propagating the belief that the whole Vulgate text was Jerome's work despite the fact it is not.

Content and date of the epistle 
"Jerome urges Paulinus, bishop of Nola, (for whom see Letter LVIII.) to make a diligent study of the Scriptures and to this end reminds him of the zeal for learning displayed not only by the wisest of the pagans but also by the apostle Paul. Then going through the two Testaments in detail he describes the contents of the several books and the lessons which may be learned from them. He concludes with an appeal to Paulinus to divest himself wholly of his earthly wealth and to devote himself altogether to God." This epistle was written in 394 A.D.

In the Gutenberg Vulgate

Creation

The Gutenberg Bible was created using a pioneering invention that allowed sheets of paper to be printed in large quantities resulting in the same quality as manuscripts. Only 135 copies of the Bible were printed on paper and 45 on vellum. The fact that such a small number of copies were produced, the innovative procedure used to create it, and the quality of the result are features that make Gutenberg and Fust authority figures in the book-making process. Additionally, because it was written in Latin, only an elite audience of aristocrats, merchants, and some educated priests could understand it.

References

External links 

 Read the letter in English
Read the letter with notes in English

Second letter to Paulinus (letter 58)
Third letter to Paulinus (letter 85)

Early printed Bibles
Latin texts